Below is list of Latin exonyms for places outside of the core of the Roman empire during the time Latin was in common use:

Albania

Austria

Belgium

Bulgaria

Czech Republic

Denmark

Egypt

France

Germany

Greece

Hungary

Ireland

Netherlands

Poland

Portugal

Romania

Russia

Saudi Arabia

Serbia

Slovakia

Spain

Sweden

Switzerland

Turkey

Ukraine

United Kingdom

See also

List of European exonyms

Exonyms
Lists of exonyms